The Iveco EuroStar is a heavy-duty truck model that was produced by Iveco from 1993 until 2003 which it got replaced by the Stralis. It replaced the 1980s-designed Turbostar.

Different performance levels from three different capacity variants were initially available:
 6-cylinder 9.5 L providing 375 HP
 6-cylinder 13.8 L providing 420 HP, also fitted on the contemporary Eurotech model
 8280.42S 8-cylinder V, providing 514 HP

Starting from 1995, Eurostar could mount the new 8210.42S, a 6-cylinder 13.8 L with a power output of 469 HP. In correspondence with, also the possibility to use EuroTronic gearbox, having full or semiautomatic modes, was introduced. In 1998-1999 the Eurostar line received the new Cursor engines.

Eurostar
Cab over vehicles
Vehicles introduced in 1993
Tractor units